St. Mark's may refer to:

Places of worship
 St Mark's Basilica, Venice, Italy
 Saint Mark's Cathedral (disambiguation)
 St. Mark's Chapel (disambiguation)
 St. Mark's Church (disambiguation)
 Saint Mark's Coptic Orthodox Church (disambiguation)
 St. Mark's Episcopal Church (disambiguation)
 St. Mark's Episcopal Cathedral (disambiguation)

Places
Croatia
 St. Mark's Square, Zagreb
Italy
 Piazza San Marco (St Mark's Square), Venice
 St Mark's Basilica, Venice
 St Mark's English Church, Florence, an Anglican church
Malta
 Saint Mark's Tower
South Africa
 St Mark's, Eastern Cape
United Kingdom
 St Marks, Leicester, a residential suburb of Leicester, England
United States
 St. Marks, Florida, a small city
 Saint Marks, Georgia, an unincorporated community
 Saint Marks, Indiana, an unincorporated community
 8th Street and St. Mark's Place, a street in the East Village in Manhattan, New York City
 St. Marks River, a river in Florida

Educational institutions
 St Mark's Academy, London, England
 St. Mark's College, Monte Grande, Buenos Aires, Argentina
 St. Mark's College (University of Adelaide), Adelaide, Australia
 St. Mark's College, Vancouver, at the University of British Columbia, Canada
 St Mark's College, Jane Furse, Limpopo Province, South Africa
 St. Mark's School (disambiguation)
 St Mark's Anglican Community School, Perth, Western Australia

Other
 St. Mark's Comics, a retailer located in New York City
 St Marks GAA, a Gaelic Athletic Association in South Dublin County, Ireland

See also
St. Mark's Square (disambiguation)
Saint Mark (disambiguation)